Guillermo Edgardo Vecchio (born March 9, 1961 in Buenos Aires, Argentina) is an Argentine professional basketball head coach.

Club coaching career
Vecchio began his coaching career in Lanus, and then moved to the Argentine League club Obras Sanitarias, where he won the William Jones World Cup in 1983. He moved to the Puerto Rican League, for 3 years with Coamo. Then he came back to Argentina, where he won 2 TNA cups with Estudiantes Concordia and Regatas SN. He also coached teams in Venezuela, Mexico, Chile, Cyprus, Saudi Arabia, Lebanon, and Bahrain.

In the 2011-12 season, he moved to back Lebanon to coach Mouttahed Tripoli, in the strong Division 1 of the Lebanese Basketball League after having previously coached Club Sagesse there.

He also was a senior scout for the Detroit Pistons of the NBA.

National team coaching career
Vecchio coached the senior men's Argentine national team between 1991 and 1996.

He won the gold medal at the 1995 Panamerican Games, and the 1995 Olympic Qualifier, that gave Argentina a presence in the 1996 Summer Olympic games, after a long drought from playing in Olympics competition. He was also the head coach of four other national teams, Mexico, Venezuela, Panama, and Chile.

References

Living people
1961 births
Argentine basketball coaches
People from Buenos Aires
Sagesse SC basketball coaches